Aladár Gerevich (16 March 1910 – 14 May 1991) was a Hungarian fencer, regarded as "the greatest Olympic swordsman ever". He won seven gold medals in sabre at six different Olympic Games.

Biography 
Gerevich is only one of two athletes to win the same event six times (despite two Games cancelled because of the Second World War). He won gold medals in 1932 and 1960, an unprecedented 28 years apart. This record for the most years between first and last Olympic medals was tied by equestrian Mark Todd of New Zealand in 2012.

Gerevich's wife, Erna Bogen (also known as Erna Bogathy), his son, Pál Gerevich, and his father-in-law, Albert Bogen (a silver medalist in team sabre for Austria at the 1912 Summer Olympics), all won Olympic medals in fencing.

In the Hungarian Olympic trials for the 1960 Rome Olympics, the fencing committee told Gerevich that he was too old to compete. He silenced them by challenging the entire sabre team to individual matches and winning every match. He missed the finals of the 1960 Olympic individual sabre event, and a possible individual gold medal, by a single touch. After retiring, he coached fencing at the Vasas Sports Club in Budapest, where he died aged 81. Asteroid 228893 Gerevich, discovered by  Krisztián Sárneczky and Brigitta Sipőcz at Piszkéstető Station in 2003, was named in his memory. The official  was published by the Minor Planet Center on 16 January 2014.

See also 
 List of athletes with the most appearances at Olympic Games
 List of multiple Olympic gold medalists
 List of multiple Olympic gold medalists in one event
 List of multiple Summer Olympic medalists

References

External links 

 www.olimpic.org: Aladár Gerevich with photos

1910 births
1991 deaths
People from Jászberény
Hungarian male sabre fencers
Fencers at the 1932 Summer Olympics
Fencers at the 1936 Summer Olympics
Fencers at the 1948 Summer Olympics
Fencers at the 1952 Summer Olympics
Fencers at the 1956 Summer Olympics
Fencers at the 1960 Summer Olympics
Olympic fencers of Hungary
Olympic gold medalists for Hungary
Olympic silver medalists for Hungary
Olympic bronze medalists for Hungary
Olympic medalists in fencing
Recipients of the Olympic Order
Medalists at the 1932 Summer Olympics
Medalists at the 1936 Summer Olympics
Medalists at the 1948 Summer Olympics
Medalists at the 1952 Summer Olympics
Medalists at the 1956 Summer Olympics
Medalists at the 1960 Summer Olympics
Burials at Farkasréti Cemetery
Hungarian male foil fencers
Sportspeople from Jász-Nagykun-Szolnok County